Ethan Pocic (born August 5, 1995) is an American football center for the Cleveland Browns of the National Football League (NFL). He played college football at LSU. Pocic has also played the guard position. He was drafted in the second round of the 2017 NFL draft by the Seattle Seahawks.

He was a second-team All-Southeastern Conference selection by SEC coaches as a junior in 2015. As a senior in 2016, Pocic was a finalist for the Rimington Trophy. That year, he was a first-team All-SEC selection by the Associated Press.

Professional career
Pocic received an invitation to the Senior Bowl and helped the South defeat the North 16-15. During the Senior Bowl, he met with the San Diego Chargers, Philadelphia Eagles, Cleveland Browns, and Baltimore Ravens. He also attended the NFL Combine and completed all the combine and positional drills. Although he attended LSU's Pro Day, he chose to only run positional drills for scouts and representatives. NFL draft experts and analysts projected Pocic to be a second or third round pick in the 2017 NFL Draft. He was ranked the second best center in the draft by NFLDraftScout.com, Sports Illustrated,
and ESPN, was ranked the fourth best interior offensive lineman in the draft by NFL analyst Bucky Brooks, and was ranked the fifth best interior offensive lineman by NFL analyst Mike Mayock.

Seattle Seahawks

The Seattle Seahawks selected Pocic in the second round (58th overall) of the 2017 NFL Draft.

Pocic made his first career start on October 22, 2017, against the New York Giants in  Week 7. In his rookie season, Pocic started five games at left guard in place of an injured Luke Joeckel and the final six games of the season at right guard in place of an injured Oday Aboushi, allowing only two sacks all season. He was named to the 2017 PFWA All-Rookie Team after a solid rookie season.

On October 11, 2019, Pocic was placed on injured reserve with a back injury. He was designated for return from injured reserve on November 27, 2019, and began practicing with the team again. He was activated on December 13, 2019. He was placed back on injured reserve on December 31, 2019.

Pocic re-signed with the Seahawks on March 22, 2021. He suffered a knee sprain in Week 1 and was placed on injured reserve on September 15, 2021. He was activated on October 15.

Cleveland Browns
On April 6, 2022, Pocic signed with the Cleveland Browns. He was named the Browns starting center to begin the season. He started the first 10 games before suffering a knee injury in Week 11. He was placed on injured reserve on November 22. He was activated on December 23.

On March 15, 2023, Pocic signed a three-year, $18 million contract extension with the Browns.

References

External links
 
 LSU Tigers bio

1995 births
Living people
American football centers
American football offensive tackles
Cleveland Browns players
LSU Tigers football players
People from Lemont, Illinois
Players of American football from Illinois
Seattle Seahawks players
Sportspeople from Cook County, Illinois
Sportspeople from DuPage County, Illinois